The  (SA; literally "Storm Detachment") was the original paramilitary wing of the Nazi Party. It played a significant role in Adolf Hitler's rise to power in the 1920s and 1930s. Its primary purposes were providing protection for Nazi rallies and assemblies, disrupting the meetings of opposing parties, fighting against the paramilitary units of the opposing parties, especially the Roter Frontkämpferbund of the Communist Party of Germany (KPD) and the Reichsbanner Schwarz-Rot-Gold of the Social Democratic Party of Germany (SPD), and intimidating Romani, trade unionists, and especially Jews.

The SA were colloquially called Brownshirts because of the colour of their  uniform's shirts, similar to Benito Mussolini's blackshirts. The official uniform of the SA was a brown shirt with a brown tie. The color came about because a large shipment of Lettow-shirts, originally intended for the German colonial troops in Germany's former East Africa colony, was purchased in 1921 by Gerhard Roßbach for use by his Freikorps paramilitary unit. They were later used for his Schill Youth organization in Salzburg, and in 1924 were adopted by the Schill Youth in Germany. The "Schill Sportversand" then became the main supplier for the SA's brown shirts.

After Adolf Hitler ordered the Night of the Long Knives in 1934, he withdrew his support for the SA. The SA continued to exist but lost almost all its influence, and was effectively superseded by the SS, which had carried out Hitler's orders in the purge, and thereafter was formally removed from the SA. The SA remained in existence until after Nazi Germany's final capitulation to the Allies in 1945, after which it was disbanded and outlawed by the Allied Control Council.

Rise 
The term  predates the founding of the Nazi Party in 1919. Originally it was applied to the specialized assault troops of Imperial Germany in World War I who used infiltration tactics based on being organized into small squads of a few soldiers each. The first official German stormtrooper unit was authorized on March 2, 1915 on the Western Front. The German high command ordered the VIII Corps to form a detachment to test experimental weapons and develop tactics that could break the deadlock on the Western Front. On October 2, 1916,  Erich Ludendorff ordered all German armies in the west to form a battalion of stormtroopers. They were first used during the 8th Army's siege of Riga, and again at the Battle of Caporetto. Wider use followed on the Western Front in the German Spring Offensive in March 1918, when Allied lines were successfully pushed back tens of kilometers.

The DAP (German Workers' Party) was formed in Munich in January 1919, and Adolf Hitler joined it in September of that year. His talents for speaking, publicity and propaganda were quickly recognized. By early 1920 he had gained authority in the party, which changed its name to the NSDAP ( or National Socialist German Workers' Party) in February 1920. The party's executive committee added "Socialist" to the name over Hitler's objections, to help the party appeal to left-wing workers.

The precursor to the  had acted informally and on an ad hoc basis for some time before this. Some 70 people attended, and a second such meeting was advertised for November 13 in the  beer hall, also in Munich. About 130 people attended; there were hecklers, but Hitler's military friends promptly ejected them by force, and the agitators "flew down the stairs with gashed heads". The next year, on February 24, he announced the party's Twenty-Five Point program at a mass meeting of some 2,000 people at the Hofbräuhaus. Protesters tried to shout Hitler down, but his former army companions, armed with rubber truncheons, ejected the dissenters. The basis for the SA had been formed.

There was little organization or structure to this group. The group was also called the "Stewards Troop" around this time. More than a year later, on August 3, 1921, Hitler redefined the group as the "Gymnastic and Sports Division" of the party, perhaps to avoid trouble with the government. It was by now well recognized as an appropriate, even necessary, function or organ of the party. The future SA developed by organizing and formalizing the groups of ex-soldiers and beer-hall brawlers who were to protect gatherings of the Nazi Party from disruptions from Social Democrats (SPD) and Communists (KPD), and to disrupt meetings of the other political parties. By September 1921 the name  (SA) was being used informally for the group. Hitler was the official head of the Nazi Party by this time.

The Nazi Party held a large public meeting in the Munich Hofbräuhaus on November 4, 1921, which attracted many Communists and other enemies of the Nazis. After Hitler had spoken for some time, the meeting erupted into a mêlée in which a small company of SA thrashed the opposition.

The leadership of the SA passed from Maurice to the young Hans Ulrich Klintzsch in this period. He had been a naval officer and a member of the  Brigade which had taken part in the failed  attempted coup. When he took over command of the SA, he was a member of the notorious Organisation Consul (OC). The Nazis under Hitler began to adopt the more professional management techniques of the military.

Its successor, the Hitler Youth ( or HJ), remained under SA command until May 1932. Hermann Göring joined the Nazi Party in 1922 after hearing a speech by Hitler. He was later appointed an SA- (lieutenant general) and held this rank on the SA rolls until 1945.

(This had been instituted after the abortive Beer Hall putsch of November 1923). While Hitler was in prison, Ernst Röhm helped to create the Frontbann as a legal alternative to the then-outlawed SA. In April 1924, Röhm had also been given authority by Hitler to rebuild the SA in any way he saw fit. When in April 1925 Hitler and Ludendorff disapproved of the proposals under which Röhm was prepared to integrate the 30,000-strong Frontbann into the SA, Röhm resigned from all political movements and military brigades on May 1, 1925. He felt great contempt for the "legalistic" path the party leaders wanted to follow and sought seclusion from public life. Throughout the 1920s and into the 1930s, members of the SA were often involved in street fights, called  (collisions), with members of the Communist Party (KPD). In 1929, the SA added a Motor Corps for better mobility and a faster mustering of units. It also acquired an independent source of funds: royalties from its own Sturm Cigarette Company. Previously, the SA had been financially dependent on the party leadership, as it charged no membership fees; the SA recruited particularly among the many unemployed in the economic crisis. The SA used violence against shops and shopkeepers stocking competing cigarette brands; it also punished any SA member caught with non-Sturm cigarettes. Sturm marketing was also used to make military service more appealing. Cigarettes were sold with collectible sets of images of historical German army uniforms.

In September 1930, as a consequence of the Stennes Revolt in Berlin, Hitler assumed supreme command of the SA as its new . He sent a personal request to Röhm, asking him to return to serve as the SA's chief of staff. Röhm accepted this offer and began his new assignment on January 5, 1931. He brought radical new ideas to the SA and appointed several close friends to its senior leadership.

Previously, the SA formations were subordinate to the Nazi Party leadership of each . Röhm established new  that had no regional Nazi Party oversight. Each Gruppe extended over several regions and was commanded by a SA  who answered only to Röhm or Hitler. In the early 1930s, the Nazis expanded from an extremist fringe group to the largest political party in Germany, and the SA expanded with it. By January 1932, the SA numbered approximately 400,000 men.

Many of these stormtroopers believed in the socialist promise of National Socialism. They expected the Nazi regime to take more radical economic action, such as breaking up the vast landed estates of the aristocracy, once they obtained national power.

Fall 

After Hitler and the Nazis obtained national power, the SA leadership also became increasingly eager for power. By the end of 1933, the SA numbered more than 3 million men, and many believed they were the replacement for the "antiquated" . Röhm's ideal was to absorb the army (then limited by law to no more than 100,000 men) into the SA, which would be a new "people's army". The SA's increasing power and ambitions also posed a threat to other Nazi leaders. The younger SS had evolved to be more than a bodyguard unit for Hitler and demonstrated that it was better suited to carry out Hitler's policies, including those of a criminal nature.

Although some of the conflicts between the SS and SA were based on personal rivalries of leaders, the mass of members had key socio-economic differences and related conflicts. SS members generally came from the middle class, while the SA had its base among the unemployed and working class. Politically speaking, the SA was more radical than the SS, with its leaders arguing the Nazi revolution had not ended when Hitler achieved power, but rather needed to implement socialism in Germany (see Strasserism). Hitler believed that the defiant and rebellious culture encouraged before the seizure of power had to give way to using these forces for community organization. But the SA members resented tasks such as canvassing and fundraising, considering them  ("little work"), which had typically been performed by women before the Nazi seizure of power. , the first Gestapo chief, estimated that in 1933 Berlin, 70 percent of new SA recruits were former Communists.

In 1933, General Werner von Blomberg, the Minister of Defence, and General Walther von Reichenau, the chief of the 's Ministerial Department, became increasingly concerned about the growing power of the SA. Röhm had been given a seat on the National Defence Council and began to demand more say over military matters. On October 2, 1933, Röhm sent a letter to Reichenau that said: "I regard the  now only as a training school for the German people. The conduct of war, and therefore of mobilization as well, in the future is the task of the SA."

Blomberg and von Reichenau began to conspire with Göring and Himmler against Röhm and the SA. Himmler asked Reinhard Heydrich to assemble a dossier on Röhm. Heydrich recognized that for the SS to gain full national power, the SA had to be broken. He manufactured evidence to suggest that Röhm had been paid 12 million marks by French agents to overthrow Hitler. Hitler liked Röhm and initially refused to believe the dossier provided by Heydrich. Röhm had been one of his first supporters and, without his ability to obtain army funds in the early days of the movement, it is unlikely that the Nazis would have ever become established. The SA under Röhm's leadership had also played a vital role in destroying the opposition during the elections of 1932 and 1933.

Night of the Long Knives 

Hitler had his own reasons for wanting Röhm removed. Some of his powerful supporters had been complaining about Röhm for some time. The generals opposed Röhm's desire to have the SA, a force of over three million men, absorb the much smaller German Army into its ranks under his leadership. Since the officers had developed the Reichswehr as a professional force of 100,000, they believed that it would be destroyed if merged with millions of untrained SA thugs. Furthermore, the army commanders were greatly concerned about reports of a huge cache of weapons in the hands of SA members. Industrialists, who had provided the funds for the Nazi victory, were unhappy with Röhm's socialistic views on the economy and his claims that the real revolution had still to take place. President Hindenburg informed Hitler in June 1934 that if a move to curb the SA was not forthcoming, he would dissolve the government and declare martial law.

Hitler was also concerned that Röhm and the SA had the power to remove him as leader. Göring and Himmler played on this fear by constantly feeding Hitler with new information on Röhm's proposed coup. A masterstroke was to claim that Gregor Strasser, whom Hitler hated, was part of the planned conspiracy against him.

On June 30, 1934, Hitler, accompanied by SS units, arrived at Bad Wiessee, where he personally placed Röhm and other high-ranking SA leaders under arrest. Over the next 48 hours, 200 other senior SA officers were arrested on the way to Wiessee. Many were shot and killed as soon as they were captured, but Hitler decided to pardon Röhm because of his past services to the movement. On July 1, after much pressure from Göring and Himmler, Hitler agreed that Röhm should die. Hitler insisted that Röhm should first be allowed to commit suicide. When Röhm refused to do so, he was shot by two SS officers, Theodor Eicke and Michael Lippert. Though the names of 85 victims are known, estimates place the total number killed at between 150 and 200 men, the rest of whom remain unidentified.

Some Germans were shocked by the executions, but many others perceived Hitler to have restored "order" to the country. Goebbels's propaganda highlighted the "Röhm-Putsch" in the days that followed. The homosexuality of Röhm and other SA leaders was made public to add "shock value", although Hitler and other Nazi leaders had known for years about the sexuality of Röhm and other named SA leaders.

After the purge 
After the Night of the Long Knives, the SA continued to operate, under the leadership of Stabschef Viktor Lutze, but the group was significantly downsized. Within a year's time, the SA membership was reduced by more than 40%. However, the Nazis increased attacks against Jews in the early 1930s and used the SA to carry these out.

In November 1938, after the assassination of German diplomat Ernst vom Rath by Herschel Grynszpan (a Polish Jew), the SA was used for "demonstrations" against the act. In violent riots, members of the SA shattered the glass storefronts of about 7,500 Jewish stores and businesses. Jewish homes were ransacked throughout Germany. This pogrom damaged, and in many cases destroyed, about 200 synagogues (constituting nearly all Germany had), many Jewish cemeteries, more than 7,000 Jewish shops, and 29 department stores. Some Jews were beaten to death and more than 30,000 Jewish men were arrested and taken to concentration camps.

Thereafter, the SA became overshadowed by the SS; by 1939 it had little remaining significance in the Nazi Party. In January 1939, the role of the SA was officially established as a training school for the armed forces, with the establishment of the SA  (SA Military Units).

In January 1941, long-standing rivalries between the Auswärtiges Amt (Foreign Office) and the SS exploded with the attempted coup d'etat in Bucharest that saw SS back the coup by the Iron Guard under its leader Horia Sima against the Prime Minister, General Ion Antonescu, while the Auswärtiges Amt together with the Wehrmacht backed Antonescu. In the aftermath of the coup, the Foreign Minister Joachim von Ribbentrop made an effort to curb the power of the SS to conduct a foreign policy independent of the Auswärtiges Amt. Taking an advantage of the long-standing rivalries between the SS and the SA, in 1941, Ribbentrop appointed an assemblage of SA men to head the German embassies in Eastern Europe, with Manfred von Killinger going to Romania, Siegfried Kasche to Croatia, Adolf-Heinz Beckerle to Bulgaria, Dietrich von Jagow to Hungary, and Hanns Ludin to Slovakia in order to ensure that there would be minimal co-operation with the SS. The role of the SA ambassadors was that of "quasi-Reich governors" as they aggressively supervised the internal affairs of the nations they were stationed in, making them very much unlike traditional ambassadors. The SA leaders ambassadors fulfilled Ribbentrop's hopes in that all had distant relations with the SS, but as a group they were notably inept as diplomats with Beckerle being so crude and vulgar in his manners that King Boris III almost refused to allow him to present his credentials at the Vrana Palace. As the ambassador in Bratislava, Ludin arranged the deportation of 50,000 Slovak Jews to Auschwitz in 1942. On 23–24 August 1944, Killinger notably bungled the German response to King Michael's Coup that saw King Michael of Romania dismiss Antonescu, sign an armistice with the Allies, and declare war on Germany, thereby costing the Reich its largest source of oil. Of the SA ambassadors, Killinger and Jagow committed suicide in 1944 and 1945 respectively while Kasche and Ludin were executed for war crimes in 1947 in Yugoslavia and Czechoslovakia respectively. Beckerle spent 11 years in a Soviet POW camp, was released to West Germany in 1955, was charged with war crimes in 1966 for his role in the deportation of Macedonian Jews, which were dropped on grounds of ill health in 1968 and died in 1976 at a retirement home in West Germany. 

In 1943, Viktor Lutze was killed in an automobile accident, and Wilhelm Schepmann was appointed as leader. Schepmann did his best to run the SA for the remainder of the war, attempting to restore the group as a predominant force within the Nazi Party and to mend years of distrust and bad feelings between the SA and SS. On the night of 29–30 March 1945, Austrian SA members were involved in a death march of Hungarian Jews from a work camp at Engerau (modern Petržalka, Slovakia) to Bad Deutsch-Altenburg that saw 102 of the Jews being killed, being either shot or beaten to death.

The SA ceased to exist in May 1945 when Nazi Germany collapsed. It was formally disbanded and outlawed by the Allied Control Council enacting Control Council Law No. 2 on October 10, 1945. In 1946, the International Military Tribunal at Nuremberg formally ruled that the SA was not a criminal organization.

Leadership 

The following men held this position:

 Emil Maurice (1920–1921)
 Hans Ulrich Klintzsch (1921–1923)
 Hermann Göring (1923)
 None (1923–1925)
 Franz Pfeffer von Salomon (1926–1930)
 Adolf Hitler (1930–1945)

In September 1930, to quell the Stennes Revolt and to try to ensure the personal loyalty of the SA to himself, Hitler assumed command of the entire organization and remained  for the remainder of the group's existence until 1945. After Hitler's assumption of the supreme command of the SA, it was the  who was generally accepted as the Commander of the SA, acting in Hitler's name. The following personnel held the position of :

 Otto Wagener (1929–1931)
 Ernst Röhm (1931–1934)
 Viktor Lutze (1934–1943)
 Max Jüttner (acting, May-August 1943)
 Wilhelm Schepmann (1943–1945)

Organization 

The SA was organized into several large regional  ("Groups"). Each  had subordinate  ("Brigades").

The SA supreme command had many sub-offices to handle supply, finance and recruiting. Unlike the SS, however, the SA did not have a medical corps nor did it establish itself outside of Germany, in occupied territories, once World War II had begun.

The SA also had several military training units. This formation expanded from regimental size in 1940 to a fully-fledged armored corps in 1945.

Organization structure August 1934–1945 
  (Supreme SA-Command & Control)
  (Group): consisting of several brigades
 : 3 to 9  (Standards)
  (Standard, regiment sized unit): 3 to 5  (Storm banns)
  (Storm bann, battalion sized unit): 3 to 5  (Storms)
  (Storm, company sized sub-unit): 3 to 4  (platoons)
  (Troupe, platoon sized sub-unit): 3 to 4  (sections)
  (section): 1 to 2  (squads or teams)
  (squad or team): 4 to 8 SA-Men/SA-Troopers
  (SA-Man/SA-Trooper)

"Beefsteaks" within the ranks 

In his 1936 Hitler: A Biography, German historian Konrad Heiden remarked that within the SA ranks, there were "large numbers of former Communists and Social Democrats" and that "many of the storm troops were called 'beefsteaks' – brown outside and red within." The influx of non-Nazis into the  membership was so prevalent that SA men would joke that "In our storm troop there are three Nazis, but we shall soon have spewed them out."

The number of "beefsteaks" was estimated to be large in some cities, especially in northern Germany, where the influence of Gregor Strasser and Strasserism was significant. The head of the Gestapo from 1933 to 1934, Rudolf Diels, reported that "70 percent" of the new SA recruits in the city of Berlin had been communists. This is evidenced further by historians, "As for the prior youth group memberships, nearly half of the SS members and nearly one-third of the instant stormtroopers were with the Free Corps, vigilantes, or militant veterans' groups during their first 25 years of life. They also came in disproportionate numbers from left-wing youth groups such as the Socialist or Communist Youth or the Red Front (RFB)."

Some have argued that since most SA members came from working-class families or were unemployed, they were more amenable to Marxist-leaning socialism, expecting Hitler to fulfill the 25-point National Socialist Program. However, historian  reports that the repeated efforts by the Communist Party of Germany (KPD) to appeal to the working-class backgrounds of the SA were "doomed to failure", because most SA men were focused on the nationalistic cult of Hitler and destroying the "Marxist enemy", a term that was used to identify both the KPD and the Social Democratic Party of Germany (SPD).

The "beefsteak" name also referred to party-switching between Nazi and Communist party members, particularly involving those within the SA ranks.

See also 

 Uniforms and insignia of the  ⇒ Corps colors of the 
 Militia
 Political color
 Political uniform
 Glossary of Nazi Germany
 List of Nazi Party leaders and officials
 National Action – Neo-nazi organization which uses logo based on SA
 SA-Feldjägerkorps (SA Field Police)

Similar paramilitary organizations

 Albanian Fascist Party – Albania ("Blackshirts")
 Black Brigades
 Blackshirts - Italy
 British Union of Fascists – United Kingdom ("Blackshirts")
 Blue Shirts Society – China
 Blueshirts – Ireland
 Black Shortsparody of the blackshirts in the writings of P. G. Wodehouse
  - independent paramilitary organizations of ex-German Army soldiers and unemployed workers who fought against Communist uprisings after World War I
 Greenshirts (National Corporate Party) – Ireland
 Gold shirts – Mexico
 Greyshirts – ethnically Dutch South Africans (Afrikaaners)
  – paramilitary wing of the NS, the Norwegian National Socialist party 1940–45.
 Integralismo
 Iron Guard – Romania ("Greenshirts")
 Italian Social Republic – ("Blackshirts")
 Militia organizations in the United States
 National Socialist Motor Corps - another Nazi Party organization
 National Socialist Flyers Corps - another Nazi Party organizaion
  – Canada ("Blueshirts")
 Portuguese Legion – Portugal
 Red Shirts (United States)
 Silver Legion of America – United States ("Silvershirts")
 
 
  paramilitary groups
 
  – paramilitary arm of the NSB, the Dutch fascist and later National Socialist political party 1931–45.

References
Informational notes

Citations

Bibliography

 
 
 
 
 
 
 
 
 
 
 
 
 
 
 
 
 
 
 
 
 
 
 
 
 

Further reading

 
 
 
 
 
 
 
 
 
 
 
 
 

 
Adolf Hitler
Military wings of fascist parties
Nazi Party organizations
Paramilitary organisations of the Weimar Republic
Anti-communism in Germany
German words and phrases
1920 establishments in Germany
Military units and formations established in 1920
Military units and formations disestablished in 1945
Clothing in politics